Syllitus bellulus is a species of beetle in the family Cerambycidae. It was described by McKeown in 1942.

References

Stenoderini
Beetles described in 1942